The Tyre Hippodrome is a UNESCO World Heritage site of the city of Tyre in south Lebanon dating back to the Second century CE The Expositio, a description of the world written  in the second half of the fourth century by an unknown writer about circuses in the Roman empire, names the Tyre Hippodrome as one of the five best racecourses in the Levant.

Geography 
Placed perpendicular to the south of the Al-Bass Tyre necropolis, the 480 meter long and 90 meter wide horseshoe shaped structure seated twenty thousand spectators who gathered to watch the death-defying sport of chariot racing.

Description 
The place is considered to be one of the largest and best preserved Roman hippodromes of its type in the Roman world. Its well conserved seating section (cavea) is surmounting a long gallery. The start boxes and parts of the  median strip (spina) with an obelisk on it are still visible. Each end of the course is marked by still existing stone turning posts (metae). Charioteers had to make this circuit seven times. Rounding the metae at top speed was the most dangerous part of the race and often produced spectacular spills.

Tyrian Games 
Although primarily meant for chariot races, the hippodrome was also used for other types of sport, and it is likely that at least some of the events of the Tyrian Games were celebrated at this place. It may have been the place where, during the Diocletianic Persecution, Christians were tortured to death.

References

Ancient Roman circuses
Archaeological sites in Lebanon
Horse racing venues in Lebanon
Roman sites in Lebanon
Tyre, Lebanon